CFVS-DT, virtual channel 25.1 (UHF digital channel 15), branded on-air as Noovo Abitibi-Témiscamingue, is a Noovo-affiliated television station licensed to Val-d'Or, Quebec, Canada and serving the Abitibi-Témiscamingue region. The station is owned by RNC Media, as part of a twinstick with TVA affiliate CFEM-DT (channel 13), licensed to the neighbouring city of Rouyn-Noranda. The two stations share studios on Avenue Murdoch and Avenue de la Saint Anne in Rouyn-Noranda; CFVS-DT's transmitter is located near Route Québec Lithium in La Corne. The station operates a rebroadcaster in Rouyn-Noranda (CFVS-DT-1) on UHF channel 20. Both transmitters flash-cut to digital on September 1, 2011.

On cable, the station is available on Câblevision du Nord de Québec channel 5 and digital channel 116.

External links
Noovo Abitibi-Témiscamingue 

FVS
FVS
Television channels and stations established in 1987
FVS
1987 establishments in Quebec